Association Sportive des Jumeaux de M'zouazia, also known as AS Jumeaux, Jumeaux de M'zouazia, Jumeaux de M'zouasia, or Jumeaux de M'zoisia, is a football club based in Mzouazia, Mayotte, France. It competes in the Régional 1 Mayotte, the highest tier of football in Mayotte.

In the 2021–22 Coupe de France, the club reached the round of 64 before being eliminated by Ligue 1 side Bordeaux in a 10–0 defeat.

Squad

References 

Football clubs in Mayotte